Robert Chee, also known as Hashke-Yil-Cale (1937–1971) was a Navajo contemporary artist and author. He is best known for his painting and serigraphy, but he also worked as an illustrator, and weaver.

Early life and education 
Robert Chee was born on December 14, 1937 in St. Michaels, Arizona. In early age, he attended school in Bellemont. His artistic talent was recognized in childhood, he started painting at age 10. Chee was enrolled in the Intermountain Indian School, where he studied under Allan Houser. He had been a member of Tewa Enterprises (around 1951), the Native American printmaking group.

Career 
From 1958 to 1961, Chee served in the United States Army and painted murals at army bases including one in Mainz, Germany. In 1959 and 1960, Chee won first prize at the Navajo Tribal Fair, and the Gallup Ceremonials in 1966. In 1963, Chee won first prize at the Philbrook Art Center (now known as the Philbrook Museum of Art). 

Chee's favorite medium to work in was watercolor, and he often used darker-colored paper (typically black or blue papers) as a background. He was known for his distinct flatstyle painting, which was in part a reflection of the earlier "studio-style" of painting taught at Dorothy Dunn's art classes in the Santa Fe Indian School's Studio School. His later work shows the suggestion of a foreground with hills or the sprigs of plants coming from the earth. In 1969, Chee started using lighter colored paper (grey or white papers), which changed the feeling of many of his works.

Death and legacy 
He died in late 1971. 

Chee's work can be found in public museum collections including the Minneapolis Institute of Art, Museum of Northern Arizona, Fred Jones Jr. Museum of Art, Arizona State Museum, Herbert F. Johnson Museum of Art, the Penticton Gallery, and the National Museum of the American Indian.

See also 

 List of Native American artists

References 

1937 births
1972 deaths
Navajo painters
20th-century American painters
20th-century Native Americans
Native American people from Arizona
Native American printmakers